Mary Theresa Dudzik (August 30, 1860 – September 20, 1918) was a Catholic nun who founded the Franciscan Sisters of Chicago in 1894.

Biography
Mary Theresa Dudzik  was born as Josephine  Dudzik on August 30, 1860 in  Płocicz, Poland. In 1881 her family emigrated to Chicago, Illinois, where she later became a member of  Third Order Secular of  St. Francis. 

In Chicago she encountered the poor, elderly and abandoned.She allowed the poor women to stay at her home.  With the support of her colleagues, she decided to purchase or rent a home to provide shelter for the poor and elderly.
She, along with her friends, generated the required funds for the charitable activities through “cleaning, cooking, and sewing in rectories and homes”. 

In 1894 she founded the "Franciscan Sisters of the Blessed Kunegunda", now known as the Franciscan Sisters of Chicago, to care the needy particularly elderly.
 
Henry Malak wrote several books and articles about her.

She died in Chicago on September 20, 1918 following “cancer.”

References

 1860 births
 1918 deaths
 

Deaths from cancer in Illinois